The Sărmăşel mine is a large salt mine located in central Romania in Mureș County, close to Sărmașu. Sărmăşel represents one of the largest salt reserves in Romania having estimated reserves of 100 billion tonnes of NaCl.

References 

Salt mines in Romania